Transtillaspis sequax is a species of moth of the family Tortricidae. It is found in Peru.

The wingspan is 17 mm. The ground colour of the forewings is brownish grey, sprinkled with brownish. The markings are browner than the ground colour. The hindwings are cream brown.

Etymology
The species name refers to the close relation to Transtillaspis plagifascia and is derived from Greek sequax (meaning immediately following somebody).

References

Moths described in 2013
Transtillaspis
Taxa named by Józef Razowski